Bishop of Johannesburg may refer to:
 the Bishop of Johannesburg in the Anglican Church; see Anglican Diocese of Johannesburg
 the Archbishop of Johannesburg in the Roman Catholic Church; see Roman Catholic Archdiocese of Johannesburg